Fried plantain is a dish cooked wherever plantains grow, from West Africa to East Africa as well as Central America, the tropical region of northern South America and the Caribbean countries like Haiti to Cuba  and in many parts of Southeast Asia, where fried snacks are widely popular. In Indonesia it is called gorengan. It is called alloco in Côte d'Ivoire and dodo in Western Nigeria, otherwise known as simply fried plantain in other parts of Nigeria. Kelewele is a fried spicy plantain or can be fried as a side dish for Red Red (African stewed black-eyed peas) and fish stew in Ghana.

Fried plantain is also eaten in some countries in South America or the Caribbean where African influence is present. For example, in the Dominican Republic, Cuba and Puerto Rico, it is common to cut plantains in slices, fry them until they are yellow, smash them between two plates and fry them again. This is also a common dish in Haiti, referred to as bannann peze, and throughout Central America, referred to as patacones in Costa Rica, Panama, Colombia and Ecuador,  and as tostones in Guatemala, Nicaragua, and Puerto Rico. In Honduras and Venezuela they are referred to as tajadas.

Consumption and uses
Fried plantain may be served as a snack, a starter or as a side dish to the main course, such as with Jollof rice, spicy barbecued meat, tomato stew or beans. It is made in different ways: salted or unsalted, cut into "ears", "fingers", can be diced, or fried whole.

Fried yellow plantains are sweet bananas from Central America and the Caribbean fried in hot oil. They are sometimes eaten with sour cream, ketchup, or a mayonnaise-ketchup mixture.

Alloco

Alloco, as it is called in Côte d'Ivoire and Burkina Faso, is called dodo in Nigeria, missolè in Cameroon and makemba in the Democratic Republic of Congo. The name alloco (sometimes seen as aloko) comes from the Baoulé, an ethnic group found in the Eastern Ivory Coast. It is derived from the word for loko which signified if a plantain was ripe. It is a popular West African snack made from fried plantain. It is often served with chili pepper and onions. In Nigeria, it often serves as a side or can be consumed by itself.

Gizdodo is a side dish in Nigeria containing fried plantain and grilled gizzard.

Alloco is widely considered as fast-food and is sold on the streets of Côte d'Ivoire. An area with many grilled meat and alloco food vendors in the Cocody neighborhood is named Allocodrome, after this dish.

Preparation 
Before preparing the alloco it is important to have the correct plantain ripeness for the recipe. Alloco specifically requires a plantain that is semi ripe, which can discerned by the color of the plantains skin. For alloco, your plantain would preferably be a bit yellow with blackened spots. Alloco is traditionally prepared frying in either peanut or palm oil. Which oil is used is dependent on the area within the Ivory Coast.

In order to make alloco, you begin by cutting the plantain, first lengthwise, then again to achieve smaller pieces. Then, heat up the oil in a sauce pan, and once hot place the plantains, and fry until they are golden/reddish brown. Once they have reached the desired color, the plantains are taken out and put on paper towel to soak up the oil. In a small amount of the remaining oil, add onions and peppers, and let them fry for a few minutes. Once ready, add the plantains back in, with a splash of water, and cover, allowing the plantains to simmer.

Often Served With 
Generally, alloco is served as a side to either a larger meal or a different snack. Often you would see alloco, served with fresh fish or even some boiled eggs. The alloco is usually served with a spicy sauce de piment to that add another dimension to the dish.

Kelewele

Kelewele is a popular Ghanaian food made of fried plantains seasoned with spices. In English, it is sometimes referred to as hot plantain crisps. In Accra, kelewele is usually sold at night by street vendors and sometimes in the afternoon by the country side women.  Kelewele is also a popular choice for dinner.

Originally from Ghana, kelewele has been popularized in America by several recipe books (recipezaar, 2009)

Preparation
The plantains are peeled and may be cut into chunks or cubes. Ginger, cayenne pepper, and salt are the typical spices used to make kelewele. Onions, anise, cloves, nutmeg, cinnamon, and chili powder, however, may also be used as spices. Commercial preparations exist that can simplify preparation and offer a standardized taste. For example, the oil should be hot and the plantain should not be too soft or it will absorb too much oil. The plantain should be fried until the sugar in it caramelizes, and produces brown edges on the plantain.

Often Served With 
It can be served with beans stew, peanuts, or alone as a dessert.

See also

 Banana chip
 Banana fritter
 Chifle
 List of banana dishes
 Tostones
 Vegetable chips

References

Further reading
 
 
 http://www.raw-food-health.net/Plantains.html

External links 
 Fried Plantain Recipe 
 Fried Plantain Chips

African cuisine
Plantain dishes
Fried foods
Street food